Air Chief Marshal Sir Hugh Pughe Lloyd,  (12 December 1894 – 14 July 1981) was a senior Royal Air Force commander.

RAF career
Lloyd joined the Royal Engineers as a sapper in 1915 during the First World War: he was wounded in action three times before enlisting as a cadet in the Royal Flying Corps in 1917 and joining No. 52 Squadron, flying the RE.8 on army co-operation missions. After the war, he remained with the recently formed Royal Air Force on a permanent commission.

In January 1939 Lloyd became Officer Commanding No. 9 Squadron, equipped with Wellingtons. Later in 1939, with the Second World War under way, he was promoted to group captain and given command of RAF Marham. His stay at RAF Marham was brief and in November he was appointed to the staff of No. 3 Group and, in May 1940, he became Senior Air Staff Officer at No. 2 Group.

On 1 June 1941, Lloyd was appointed Air Officer Commanding in Malta, with the difficult task of protecting the island from German and Italian air attacks as well as attacking Axis shipping delivering supplies to Erwin Rommel's Afrika Korps in North Africa. However, his lack of knowledge of fighter tactics and the dominance of the Messerschmitt Bf 109F against the outdated Hawker Hurricane, prolonged the Siege of Malta. When Generalfeldmarschall Albert Kesselring was appointed to lead the Axis air-offensive from December 1941, RAF Command at last reacted. After installing a fighter control room similar to those in the United Kingdom, from April 1942 they assigned the island two squadrons of Supermarine Spitfires totaling 47 aircraft, which led later that year to the Allies moving to an offensive campaign.

Lloyd was assigned to RAF headquarters in the Middle East as Senior Air Staff Officer in 1942 and commanded the Northwest African Coastal Air Force and then the Mediterranean Allied Coastal Air Force in 1943. His role there was to carry out harrying of enemy transport by land and sea. In November 1944 he was appointed commander designate of Tiger Force, a Commonwealth heavy bomber force which was intended to join the air offensive against Japan but was disbanded shortly after the nuclear bombings of Hiroshima and Nagasaki effectively ended the war.

Postwar years
After two years as senior instructor at the Imperial Defence College, Lloyd was made Air Officer Commanding Air Command Far East, later retitled Far East Air Force. He was made Air Officer Commanding-in-Chief Bomber Command in February 1950 before he retired in June 1953.

Lloyd was President of the London Welsh Trust, which runs the London Welsh Centre, from 1962 until 1964.

References

Further reading
 Lloyd, Sir Hugh, Briefed to attack: Malta's Part in African Victory (Hodder & Stoughton, 1949) (which inspired the film Malta Story)

|-

1894 births
1981 deaths
Royal Air Force air marshals
Royal Flying Corps officers
British Army personnel of World War I
Royal Engineers soldiers
Knights Grand Cross of the Order of the British Empire
Knights Commander of the Order of the Bath
Recipients of the Military Cross
Recipients of the Distinguished Flying Cross (United Kingdom)
Recipients of the Croix de Guerre 1914–1918 (France)
Officiers of the Légion d'honneur
Officers of the Legion of Merit
People from Malvern Hills District
Military personnel from Worcestershire